Marko Jovičić (born 2 February 1995) is a Serbian professional footballer who plays as a goalkeeper for Maltese club Mosta.

Career
Jovičić made his senior debuts with Žarkovo in the Serbian League Belgrade.

In the 2015 winter transfer window, Jovičić switched to Teleoptik.

In early 2016, Jovičić signed a five-year deal with Partizan.

On 14 September 2021, he returned to Malta and joined Mosta.

Honours
Partizan
 Serbian SuperLiga: 2016–17
 Serbian Cup: 2015–16, 2016–17, 2017–18

References

External links
 Srbijafudbal profile
 
 

1995 births
Footballers from Belgrade
Living people
Serbian footballers
Association football goalkeepers
FK Partizan players
FK Teleoptik players
OFK Žarkovo players
Hibernians F.C. players
FK Inđija players
Mosta F.C. players
Serbian SuperLiga players
Maltese Premier League players
Serbian expatriate footballers
Expatriate footballers in Malta
Serbian expatriate sportspeople in Malta